Edoardo Gabbriellini (born 16 July 1975) is an Italian actor, screenwriter, and director.

Life and career 
Born in Livorno, at 18 years old Gabbriellini was chosen by Paolo Virzì to star in his film Ovosodo. For his performance he won the Pasinetti Award for best actor at the 54th edition of the Venice International Film Festival, and subsequently left his studies to devote himself to acting.

After directing the music video for the song "Tre parole" by Valeria Rossi, Gabbriellini made his feature film directorial debut in 2003 with the comedy-drama B.B. e il cormorano, which was screened in the International Critics' Week section of the Cannes Film Festival.

Selected filmography 
As actor 
Ovosodo (1997) 
Kisses and Hugs (1999) 
Now or Never (2003)
Bartali: The Iron Man (TV, 2006)
Your Whole Life Ahead of You (2008)
Il mostro di Firenze (TV, 2009)
I Am Love (2009)
Unlikely Revolutionaries (2010) 
Some Say No (2011) 
The Face of an Angel (2014)  
Banat (2015)
Quel bravo ragazzo (2016)

As director and screenwriter
B.B. e il cormorano (2003)  
The Landlords (2012)

References

External links 
 

1975 births
Living people
Italian film directors
Italian screenwriters
Italian male screenwriters
People from Livorno
20th-century Italian people
Italian male film actors
Italian male television actors
Italian male stage actors